Jasminum humile, the Italian jasmine or yellow jasmine, is a species of flowering plant in the family Oleaceae, native to Afghanistan, Tajikistan, Pakistan, Nepal, Burma (Myanmar), the Himalayas and south west China (Gansu, Guizhou, Sichuan, Xizang (Tibet), Yunnan). The species is widely cultivated and reportedly naturalized in Greece, Sicily and the former Yugoslavia.

It has stout, dark green leaves, 5 cm long, with 5-7 imparipinnate leaflets. In protected areas it retains its leaves over winter, though in cold winters its foliage and buds may freeze. It blooms in spring and summer with clusters of usually six yellow, scented flowers.

Numerous cultivars have been developed for garden use, of which 'Revolutum' (syn. J. reevesii 
) has gained the Royal Horticultural Society's Award of Garden Merit.

Etymology
Jasminum is a Latinized version of the Persian name yasemin, or Arabic name, yasamin, which refers to scented plants.

The Latin specific epithet humile means "low-growing".

References

humile
Plants described in 1753
Taxa named by Carl Linnaeus
Flora of Afghanistan
Flora of Tajikistan
Flora of the Indian subcontinent
Flora of Myanmar
Flora of Tibet
Flora of Gansu
Flora of Guizhou
Flora of Sichuan
Flora of Yunnan